Myrmica sabuleti is a species of ant in the genus Myrmica. The species is indigenous to Europe, and most colonies are polygynous. Caterpillars of the large blue butterfly (Phengaris arion) parasitically prey on this ant. The caterpillar hatches on Wild Thyme buds and then at the fourth-instar stage tricks the ants into believing it is one of their own larvae. The worker ants then carry the caterpillar to their nest, where it feeds on the ant grubs for 10 months before pupating and emerging as a butterfly.

See also
Zodarion rubidum, a spider that mimics and feeds on Myrmica sabuleti

References

External links

Myrmica
Insects described in 1861
Hymenoptera of Europe
Taxa named by Frederik Vilhelm August Meinert